is a passenger railway station in located in the city of Higashiōsaka,  Osaka Prefecture, Japan, operated by the private railway operator Kintetsu Railway.

Lines
Yoshita Station is served by the Keihanna Line, and is located 3.0 rail kilometers from the starting point of the line at Nagata Station and 20.9 kilometers from Cosmosquare Station.

Station layout
The station consists of two elevated side platforms with the station building underneath.

Platforms

History
Yoshita Station opened on October 1, 1986

Passenger statistics
In fiscal 2018, the station was used by an average of 15,369 passengers daily.

Surrounding area
 Higashi Osaka Hanazono Rugby Stadium
 Higashiōsaka Buffer Green Park
 Hanazono Central Park

See also
List of railway stations in Japan

References

External links

 Yoshita Station 

Railway stations in Japan opened in 1986
Railway stations in Osaka Prefecture
Stations of Kintetsu Railway
Higashiōsaka